Grand Valley/Luther Field Aerodrome  is an aerodrome located  north northwest of Grand Valley, Ontario, Canada.

See also
Grand Valley North Aerodrome
Grand Valley (Madill Field) Aerodrome
Grand Valley (Martin Field) Aerodrome
Grand Valley (Black Field) Aerodrome

References 

Registered aerodromes in Ontario